Don Whitehead (April 8, 1908 in Inman, Virginia - January 12, 1981) was an American journalist.  He was awarded the Medal of Freedom.  He won the 1950 George Polk Award for wire service reporting.

He was awarded the 1951 Pulitzer Prize for International Reporting, and 1953 Pulitzer Prize for National Reporting.

Education

Whitehead studied at University of Kentucky from 1926 to 1928.

Career

Kentucky
Beginning in 1928, Whitehead worked for the newspapers Lafollette Press and the Daily Enterprise in Harlan, Kentucky, and he covered the Harlan County War.

World War II
Beginning in 1935, he worked for the Associated Press, covering World War II. His beats included coverage of the Eighth Army in Egypt, in September 1942, after which he was transferred to cover the American Army in Algeria. He then covered the Allied invasion of Sicily at Gela, with the First Infantry Division, the Allied invasion of Italy at Salerno, and the Italian campaign. He landed at Anzio in January 1944, then went to London to prepare for the Allied invasion of France. He landed on Omaha Beach on D-Day (June 6, 1944), with the 16th Regiment, of the First Infantry Division, and covered the push from the beachhead, Operation Cobra at Saint-Lô, and the pursuit across France. He got the first story on the Liberation of Paris and covered the U.S. First Army's push into Belgium and into Germany, and the crossing of the Rhine River. He also covered the meeting of American and Russian troops on the Elbe River.

Korean War
Whitehead covered the Korean War in 1950. He won the 1953 Pulitzer Prize for National Reporting for "The Great Deception", his account of a secret trip to the war zone by President-elect Dwight Eisenhower.

Stateside
He was Washington bureau chief for the New York Herald Tribune, in 1956. In 1934, he worked for a year as a columnist for the Knoxville News-Sentinel before leaving to work as an editor for the Associated Press. His book, The FBI Story'' was adapted into a 1959 film.

Papers
His papers are held at the University of Tennessee.

Personal life
Don Whitehead married Marie Patterson on December 20, 1928. They had a daughter, Ruth, and two grandchildren.

Works

Posthumous

References

External links

https://web.archive.org/web/20111122085639/http://ap.org/pages/about/pulitzer/white.html
http://www.swvamuseum.org/donwhitehead.html
Guide to the Don Whitehead Journey Into Crime manuscripts, housed at the University of Kentucky Libraries Special Collections Research Center

1908 births
1981 deaths
American male journalists
20th-century American journalists
George Polk Award recipients
Pulitzer Prize for International Reporting winners
Pulitzer Prize for National Reporting winners
American war correspondents
20th-century American non-fiction writers
20th-century American male writers
People from Wise County, Virginia
Journalists from Virginia
University of Kentucky alumni
Journalists from Kentucky